Verrettes is a commune in the Saint-Marc Arrondissement, in the Artibonite department of Haiti. It is located approximately 58 km north of the capital, Port-au-Prince, and has 48,724 inhabitants.

 Settlements
 DesJardins
 Deschapelles 
 Borel 
 Désarmes
 Bastien

History 
Verrettes is also known as the birthplace of the late president Dumarsais Estimé.  During his presidency, he made great efforts to modernize the commune of Verrettes by constructing the water distribution system of "Bassin Vincent", building streets with sidewalks, and a modern sewer system.  Unfortunately, subsequent governments abandoned this urbanization work, as the pavement of some streets was not completed.

Culture 
The city of Verrettes has mostly been unaffected by Haiti's political turmoil and natural disasters. The small city is uneventful with a very low crime rate, but with an active nightlife. The city downtown is known for its live music, restaurants, clubs, and is also known as the playground for the town teenagers.

The city is very self-sufficient with most of the population consuming goods produced from nearby family farms in rural neighborhoods. Most of the formal businesses are owned by the city's upper middle class residence. Their homes are usually located near the downtown area; just like Port-au-Prince most of the upper-middle-class homes are surrounded by large cement walls with iron gates or some sort of fences.

Verrettes is mostly known for its strong emphasis on education; many rural town peasants relocate their children to Verrettes for their schooling, they usually rent houses and apartments in the town for their children to stay in. The middle and upper middle class residence are known for sending their children to Port-au-Prince to finish their studies. In the past few decades, there has been a large exodus of the upper middle class out of Haiti.

Religion 
At Verrettes "l’Eglise de la Nativité" (Church of Nativity) is still one of the largest churches of the country.  The religion of the city is mainly Catholic & Protestant with a small percentage practicing Vodou.

School 
Jardin D'enfants: Kindergartner  
La Providence: Primary School
L'école Frere: Catholic School for Boys
L'école Mere:  Catholic School for Girls
Charles Belair: Secondary School
Indistrielle: Secondary School
Lycée Garry: College Dumarsais Estimé
 Lycée Jacques Stephen et Alexis
 Centre de Formation Classique
 Centre D'etudes Secondaire des Verrettes
 Centre d'Etudes Secondaire de Deschapelles
 Ecole Mixte Gerald
 Ecole Mixte Pelerin de Deschapelles
Institution Mixte Joseph C. Bernard
institution Mixte Jean Piaget
Institution  Mixte Finotte Etienne
institution Mixte Cerelus Pierre Glaude

Public Building 
Hôtel de Ville 
L'hôpital Dumarsais Estimé 
L'Église de la Nativité 
Salle de Royaume
Hollywood Club
Verrettes Cinema

2010 earthquake 
The city's senator died in the 2010 Haiti earthquake.

La Providence is currently hosting 300 Jacmelien from the city of Jacmel displaced by the earthquake.

References

Populated places in Artibonite (department)
Communes of Haiti